John S. Pistole (born June 1, 1956) is the former administrator of the United States Transportation Security Administration (TSA) and a former deputy director of the Federal Bureau of Investigation. He is currently the president of Anderson University.

Education
Pistole was born on June 1, 1956 in Baltimore, Maryland. He is a graduate of Anderson University and the Indiana University Robert H. McKinney School of Law, a division of Indiana University – Purdue University Indianapolis. Pistole practiced law for two years before joining the FBI in 1983.

Public service
Since the World Trade Center and Pentagon attacks, John Pistole has been involved in the formation of terrorism policies during the Bush and Obama administrations.

9/11 Commission
On April 14, 2004, Pistole testified before the 9/11 Commission at its 10th public hearing on a panel, Preventing Future Attacks Inside the United States.

On June 16, 2004, Pistole testified before the 9/11 Commission at its 12th public hearing. The page on the 9/11 Commission website does not include Pistole's name, and the PDF transcript does not list him as a participant, but he testified on June 16, 2004 as a panelist. He discussed threat levels of a possible attack by Al-Qaeda in 2004, as well as other topics.

On August 23, 2004, Pistole testified before Congress about changes the FBI made in response to the 9/11 Commission.

Pistole and Valerie E. Caproni were the two FBI officials who approved a memo laying out the FBI's policy on the limits to the interrogation of captives taken during the United States' war on terror.
The memo was from the FBI's general counsel, to all offices, explaining that FBI officials were not allowed to engage in coercive interrogations; FBI officials were not allowed to sit in on coercive interrogations conducted by third parties; FBI officials were required to immediately report any instances of suspected coercive interrogation up the FBI chain of command.

FBI
Pistole served as deputy director  of the FBI from October 2004 to May 2010. As deputy director, Pistole was second in command within the FBI and pivotally involved in the formation of terrorism policies.

TSA
Pistole was nominated by President Barack Obama to serve as administrator of the Transportation Security Administration on May 17, 2010 and was unanimously confirmed to serve in that position by the United States Senate on June 25, 2010. On November 16, 2010, Pistole defended his agency's new extensive pat-down procedures and Advanced Imaging Technology (A.I.T) as necessary.

On November 21, 2010, Pistole again justified the new search policies on CNN saying "We know through intelligence that there are determined people, terrorists who are trying to kill not only Americans but innocent people around the world." 

On November 21, 2010, Pistole acknowledged that new TSA screening procedures are "invasive" and "uncomfortable" but said they were necessary. Many questions raised by American citizens regarding this policy remain unanswered and Pistole has remained silent regarding significant constitutional objections.

After a February 2011 attempt by a TSA VIPR team in Savannah to search passengers disembarking from an Amtrak train, the TSA was banned from Amtrak property by Amtrak Police Chief John O'Connor.

On October 16, 2014, Pistole announced that he would retire as TSA administrator effective December 31, 2014, and take a position in academia. On October 27, 2014, he was elected to be the fifth president of his alma mater, Anderson University in Anderson, Indiana.

On May 30, 2017, news broke that President Donald Trump contacted Pistole about an interview to fill the opening created by the firing of FBI Director James Comey.

Anderson University
On March 2, 2015, Pistole began his presidency as  Anderson University's fifth president. Students of Anderson University commonly refer to him as "PJP" (President John Pistole).

Book
On February 3, 2021 a biography about John was released called John S. Pistole: Searching for Integrity & Faith.

References

External links

|-

|-

1956 births
Anderson University (Indiana) alumni
Deputy Directors of the Federal Bureau of Investigation
Indiana University Robert H. McKinney School of Law alumni
Living people
Obama administration personnel
Politicians from Baltimore
Transportation Security Administration officials